Partita (also partie, partia, parthia, or parthie) was originally the name for a single-instrumental piece of music (16th and 17th centuries), but Johann Kuhnau (Thomaskantor until 1722), his student Christoph Graupner, and Johann Sebastian Bach used it for collections of musical pieces, as a synonym for suite.

Johann Sebastian Bach wrote two sets of partitas for different instruments. Those for solo keyboard the composer published as his Opus 1 (known as the Klavierübung I).  One additional suite in B minor, the Overture in the French Style (often simply called French Overture) is sometimes also considered a partita. See Partitas for keyboard (825–830) and choral partitas for organ. The "Partita" in A minor for solo flute (BWV 1013) which takes the form of a suite of four dances, has been given the title "partita" by its modern editors; it is sometimes transposed for oboe.

Bach also wrote three partitas for solo violin in 1720 which he paired with sonatas. (He titled each of them the German Partia, but they came to be called the Italian partita, which was introduced in the Bach Gesellschaft edition in 1879, being the more common term at the time.) See: Sonatas and partitas for solo violin.

The most prolific composer of partitas for harpsichord was Christoph Graupner, whose works in the form number about 57. The first set was published in 1718 and dedicated to his patron Ernest Louis, Landgrave of Hesse-Darmstadt. The last of his partitas exist in manuscripts dated 1750. They are difficult and virtuosic pieces which exhibit an astonishing variety of musical styles. See: List of harpsichord pieces by Christoph Graupner. The longest partita ever written so far is Shoah for Solo Violin and Sacred Temple by Jorge Grundman, which lasts an hour and a half and was finished in 2016.

Examples
Listed by composer:
 Johann Paul von Westhoff: Partitas for solo violin
 Johann Sebastian Bach;
Partita for Violin No. 1
Partita for Violin No. 2 (1720)
Partita for Violin No. 3 
Partita in A minor for solo flute
 Christoph Graupner
 Monatliche Clavier Früchte, GWV 109–120. 12 Partitas for Harpsichord (1722)
 45 Partitas for Harpsichord (1718-1750)
 Luigi Dallapiccola: Partita for orchestra (1932)
 William Walton: Partita for Orchestra (1957)
 Krzysztof Penderecki: Partita for Harpsichord and Orchestra (1972)
 Philip Glass:
Partita for Double Bass (2015)
Partita No. 1 for Solo Cello, "Songs and Poems"
Partita No. 2 for Solo Cello
 Jorge Grundman
 Shoah for Solo Violin and Sacred Temple (2016)
 Stephen Hough: Partita for piano (2019)

Audio files
Johann Kuhnau: a choral partita from 'Biblische Historien'. Here it is called 'Sonata 4' (a programmatic title is added). The tune or cantus firmus is the famous chorale O Haupt voll Blut und Wunden

References

External links
https://web.archive.org/web/20060716075418/http://www.jsbach.org/bwvs800.html contains the BWV listing including the Partitas (with their tonalities).

Musical forms